is a Japanese speed skater. She competed in the women's 500 metres at the 2010 Winter Olympics.

References

1979 births
Living people
Japanese female speed skaters
Olympic speed skaters of Japan
Speed skaters at the 2010 Winter Olympics
Speed skaters at the 1996 Asian Winter Games
Speed skaters at the 2003 Asian Winter Games
Speed skaters at the 2007 Asian Winter Games
Medalists at the 2003 Asian Winter Games
Asian Games medalists in speed skating
Asian Games bronze medalists for Japan
University of Tsukuba alumni
Sportspeople from Nagano Prefecture
20th-century Japanese women
21st-century Japanese women